Whatever Happened to Love? is a 1982 live album by the American jazz singer Betty Carter. It is her only live album to include a string section on some tracks.

"Abre la Puerta" is a wordless version of Carter's signature tune "Open the Door".
Carter was nominated for the Grammy Award for Best Jazz Vocal Performance, Female at the 26th Annual Grammy Awards for her performance on this album.

Track listing
"What a Little Moonlight Can Do" (Harry M. Woods)  – 10:10
"Cocktails for Two" (Sam Coslow, Arthur Johnston)  – 6:20
"Social Call" (Gigi Gryce) - 2:23
"Goodbye" (Gordon Jenkins)  – 7:29
"With No Words" (Betty Carter)  – 4:31
"New Blues (you Purrrrrrr)" (Carter)  – 6:20
"I Cry Alone" (Burt Bacharach, Hal David)  – 4:30
"Abre la Puerta" (Carter)  – 7:05
"Ev'ry Time We Say Goodbye" (Porter)  – 5:48

Personnel
 Betty Carter – vocals
 Khalid Moss – piano
 Curtis Lundy – double bass
 Lewis Nash – drums

References

Betty Carter live albums
1982 live albums
Verve Records live albums
Albums recorded at the Bottom Line